Lisa Daniels (31 December 1930 – 12 February 2010) was a British stage, film and television actress. After beginning her career on the West End stage she moved to Hollywood and worked predominantly in the United States. She also worked as a voice actress on the 1961 Disney film One Hundred and One Dalmatians as Perdita.

Filmography
 Man in the Attic (1953) - Mary Lenihan
 Princess of the Nile (1954) - Handmaiden
 The Gambler from Natchez (1954) - Ivette Rivage
 The Glass Slipper (1955) - Serafina
 The Virgin Queen (1955) - Mary
 One Hundred and One Dalmatians (1961) - Perdita (voice)
 The Swimmer (1968) - Matron at the Biswangers' Pool (uncredited)
 The Andromeda Strain (1971) - Woman (uncredited)
 Swashbuckler (1976) - Pirates' Lady

References

Bibliography 
 Charles Affron. Star acting: Gish, Garbo, Davis. Dutton, 1977.
 John Grant. Encyclopedia of Walt Disney's animated characters. Hyperion Books, 1998.

External links 
 

1930 births
2010 deaths
British television actresses
British film actresses
British stage actresses
Actresses from Birmingham, West Midlands
British emigrants to the United States